Series 201 to Series 299 may refer to:

Series 201-210
 Peugeot 20* compact automobile series:
 Peugeot 201 series (1929-1937)
 Peugeot 202 series (1938-1949)
 Peugeot 203 series (1948-1960)
 Peugeot 204 series (1965-1976)
 Peugeot 205 series (1983-1998)
 Peugeot 206 series (1998-2008)
 Peugeot 207 series (2006-2014)
 Peugeot 208 series (2012-current)
 EA201 series, Indonesian train series
 201 series,  Japanese train series
 KiHa 201 series, Japanese train series
 EA202 series, Indonesian train series
 203 series, Indonesian train series
 205 series, Indonesian train series
 Junkers Jumo 205, aircraft engine series
 HB-E210 series,  Japanese train series
 Datsun 210, Nissan automobile series

Series 211-220
 211 series,  Japanese train series
 215 series,  Japanese train series
 DAF F218 series, the truck series

Series 221-230

Series 231-240
 E231 series,  Japanese train series
 E233 series,  Japanese train series
 E235 series,  Japanese train series
 Volvo 240 series, the automobile series:

Series 241-250
 DAF F241 series, the truck series
 Ferrari 250, the spotrcar series

Series 251-260
 251 series,  Japanese train series
 Volvo 260 series, the automobile series:

Series 261-270
 E261 series,  Japanese train series

Series 271-280
 271 series,  Japanese train series

Series 281-290
 281 series,  Japanese train series
 KiHa 283 series,  Japanese train series
 KiHa 285 series,  Japanese train series

Series 291-299